Grenelle Mountain is a  mountain summit located in British Columbia, Canada.

Description

Grenelle Mountain is a glaciated peak situated in the Waddington Range of the Coast Mountains, in a remote wilderness area that few visit. Other neighbors between Waddington and Grenelle include Spearman Peak, Mount Munday, Arabesque Peaks and Bravo Peak. Precipitation runoff and glacier meltwater from Grenelle Mountain drains to Bute Inlet via the Homathko River. Topographic relief is significant as the summit rises 1,500 meters (4,920 feet) above the Tiedemann Glacier in two kilometers (1.2 mile).

History
The name "Crenelle Mountain" was originally submitted in January 1928 by mountaineer Don Munday and officially adopted 19 December 1968. Munday so-named it because of its likeness to crenelles and battlements. The spelling "Grenelle", although misconstrued, is firmly entrenched in the mountaineering community, according to April 1978 advice from Dr. Glenn Woodsworth, Geological Survey of Canada and Alpine Club of Canada representative to the Geographical Names Board of Canada. The "Grenelle Mountain" toponym was officially adopted May 1, 1978, by the Geographical Names Board of Canada.

The first ascent of the summit was made in July 1950 by Allen Steck, William W. Dunmire, Oscar Cook, Richard Houston, James Wilson, Philip Bettler, William Long and Raymond de Saussure.

Climate

Based on the Köppen climate classification, Grenelle Mountain has an ice cap climate. Most weather fronts originate in the Pacific Ocean, and travel east toward the Coast Mountains where they are forced upward by the range (Orographic lift), causing them to drop their moisture in the form of rain or snowfall. As a result, the Coast Mountains experience high precipitation, especially during the winter months in the form of snowfall. Temperatures can drop below −20 °C with wind chill factors  below −30 °C. This climate supports the Waddington, Splendour and Tiedemann glaciers which cover the slopes of Grenelle Mountain.

See also
 
 Geography of British Columbia

References

External links
 Weather: Grenelle Mountain
 First ascent team (photo)

Pacific Ranges
Three-thousanders of British Columbia
Waddington Range
Range 2 Coast Land District
Coast Mountains